Ian Christopher Bridge (born 18 September 1959) is a football coach and former professional who played as a defender. A former player for the Canada national team, he has coached the Canada women's national team among other teams.

Club career
Bridge was born in Victoria, British Columbia. He began his pro career in 1977 and played in the NASL with the Seattle Sounders from 1979 to 1983 and with the Vancouver Whitecaps in 1984, and MISL indoor soccer with the Tacoma Stars. Over six NASL seasons he played 124 games and scored 13 goals. Following the demise of the NASL Bridge played for Swiss club FC La Chaux-de-Fonds for two seasons when the club was in the Swiss league first division.  Later in the Canadian Soccer League, he played for the Victoria Vistas (1990), Kitchener Kickers (1991), and North York Rockets (1991). Ian played his youth soccer with the Lakehill Soccer Association in Victoria BC, and has an annually awarded Youth Player "Inspirational" trophy named in his honour.

International career
A defender, Bridge made his debut for Canada in an October 1981 friendly match against Trinidad & Tobago and earned 34 caps, scoring 5 goals. He has represented Canada in 12 FIFA World Cup qualification matches and played all three of Canada's games at the 1986 FIFA World Cup finals, the country's only appearance at a World Cup finals. Bridge also played for Canada at the 1984 Olympics and at the 1979 FIFA World Youth Championship. He scored a goal in the first two 1982 FIFA World Cup qualifying games that he played in. His final international was a June 1991 CONCACAF Gold Cup Finals match against Mexico.

Bridge was inducted into the Canadian Soccer Hall of Fame in 2003.

Managerial career
Bridge was head coach of the University of Victoria women's soccer team from 1990 to 2000. He became assistant coach of Canada women's national soccer team in 1997, a position he still has. He became U-19 national women's coach and chief national team assistant coach in March 2001. (The national youth women's team has since become U-20.)
Bridge is also team chef of the Canada men's national youth soccer teams. On 10 January 2010, Bridge resigned as head coach of the U-17 Canadian women national team and is now coaching the Victoria Highlanders of the USL (United Soccer league) Premier Development League.

Career statistics
Scores and results list Canada's goal tally first, score column indicates score after each Bridge goal.

References

External links

 / Canada Soccer Hall of Fame
 Greater Victoria Sports Hall of Fame inductee page for Bridge
 NASL/MISL stats
 

1959 births
Living people
Soccer players from Victoria, British Columbia
Canadian people of British descent
Association football defenders
Canadian soccer players
Canada men's international soccer players
Canadian expatriate soccer players
Canadian expatriate sportspeople in Switzerland
Canadian expatriate sportspeople in the United States
Footballers at the 1984 Summer Olympics
1986 FIFA World Cup players
1991 CONCACAF Gold Cup players
CONCACAF Championship-winning players
Seattle Sounders (1974–1983) players
Vancouver Whitecaps (1974–1984) players
Tacoma Stars players
FC La Chaux-de-Fonds players
Victoria Vistas players
North York Rockets players
North American Soccer League (1968–1984) players
North American Soccer League (1968–1984) indoor players
Major Indoor Soccer League (1978–1992) players
Swiss Super League players
Canadian Soccer League (1987–1992) players
Expatriate footballers in Switzerland
Expatriate soccer players in the United States
Canadian soccer coaches
Canada Soccer Hall of Fame inductees
Olympic soccer players of Canada
FC La Chaux-de-Fonds managers
Canada men's youth international soccer players
Kitchener Spirit players